Gerald Paul Joseph Cajetan Carmel Antony Martin Strickland, 6th Count della Catena, 1st Baron Strickland,  (24 May 1861 – 22 August 1940) was a Maltese and British politician and peer, who served as Prime Minister of Malta, Governor of the Leeward Islands, Governor of Tasmania, Governor of Western Australia and Governor of New South Wales, in addition to sitting successively in the House of Commons and House of Lords in the Parliament of the United Kingdom.

Early life
Strickland was born in Valletta, the son of naval officer Commander Walter Strickland, from the ancient English Strickland family of Sizergh, and Maria Aloysia Bonici-Mompalao, the niece and heiress of Sir Nicholas Sceberras Bologna, fifth Count della Catena in Malta, whom Gerald succeeded in 1875. He was educated at St Mary's College, Oscott, and Trinity College, Cambridge (BA, LLB). Upon graduating, he was admitted to Inner Temple in 1887 entitled to practise as a barrister-at-law. He gained the rank of major in the service of the Royal Malta Militia.

Elected in 1886 to the council of the government of Malta, Strickland began to take an active part in Maltese politics at an early age and in December 1887, he accompanied Dr. Fortunato Mizzi – founder of the Maltese Nationalist Party – to the first Colonial Conference in London to submit a scheme for a legislative assembly. The result was that the new Maltese Constitution of December 1887 was largely based on the joint Strickland-Mizzi proposals. In the following year, he was appointed as Assistant Secretary to Malta in 1888 and held the office of Chief Secretary of Malta in 1889, a post which he held till July 1902 when to avert more troubles in Malta which were created by his orders-in-council to increase taxation, he was appointed as Governor of the Leeward Islands in the Caribbean.

Sir Gerald and Lady Edeline Strickland left Southampton for Antigua in September 1902, and took up residence at Government House, St Johns on arrival. He was appointed as Governor of Tasmania in 1904, serving as such until 1909, and then as Governor of Western Australia from 1909 to 1913. In the early years consequent upon Australian Federation he was involved in the delicate matter of State rights and the developing nature of the appointment, role and salaries of governors. Appointed as Governor of New South Wales in March 1913, on 30 May 1913 he was made a Knight Grand Cross of the Order of St Michael and St George (GCMG). He was a supporter of the Eugenics Education Society.

Political career
In 1917, Strickland returned to Malta and, after the grant of Self-Government, formed the Anglo-Maltese Party in 1921, which soon afterward amalgamated with the Maltese Constitutional Party to become the Constitutional Party under his leadership. Strickland was the leader of the Opposition between 1921 and 1927. In 1924, he won the seat of Lancaster for the Conservatives in the United Kingdom House of Commons. He left the House of Commons in 1928 upon being made a peer.

After the 1927 election, Strickland had a majority in the Legislative Assembly and became Head of the Ministry (the fourth Prime Minister of Malta) from August 1927 until 1932. Amongst the most important events of his government were the commencement of building works for St. Luke's Hospital in Gwardamanġia and his clash with the Senate, which led to the issue of Letters Patent which curtailed its powers and his concurrent clash with the ecclesiastical authorities. 

On 1 May 1930, Sir Mauro Monsignor Caruana, Titular Archbishop of Rhodes and Bishop of Malta, and Mikiel Monsignor Gonzi, Bishop of Gozo, issued a pastoral letter, read in all the churches of Malta and Gozo. In it, Archbishop Caruana and Bishop Gonzi declared that whoever voted for the Constitutional Party and its former coalition partner, the Labour Party, committed a mortal sin. That year he narrowly avoided assassination.

This mortal sin was also committed by those who read Strickland's newspapers, printed by his Progress Press, namely the Daily Malta Chronicle and Ix-Xemx. He subsequently began publishing Il-Progress and Il-Berqa. The clash between the Catholic bishops and the Constitutional Party led to the suspension of the Maltese Constitution following consultations between the British Governor and London.

Between July 1932 and November 1933, Strickland was again the leader of the Opposition, and after the grant of a new Constitution in 1939, he became the leader of the elected majority in the Council of Government.

Personal life

Strickland married Lady Edeline Sackville-West (1870–1918), the daughter of the 7th Earl De La Warr and the Honourable Constance Mary Elizabeth Cochrane-Wishart-Baillie, on 26 August 1890. They had six daughters, and two sons who died at an early age. Their first daughter married Henry Hornyold, became known as Mrs Hornyold-Strickland and chaired the Conservative Party Conference in 1947.
They had the following children:
 Reginald Strickland (1892–1893)
 Hon. Mary Christina Strickland (1896–1970)
 Hon. Cecilia Victoria Strickland (1897–1982)
 Hon. Mabel Edeline Strickland OBE (1899–1988)
 Margaret Angela Strickland (1900–1901)
 Hon. Henrietta May Strickland (1903–1975), who married Robert Tatton Bower
 Walter Strickland (1901–1902)
 Hon. Dr. Constance Teresa Strickland LMSSA (1912–1979)

On 31 August 1926, following the death of Lady Edeline in 1918, Strickland married Margaret Hulton, daughter of the newspaper proprietor Edward Hulton in the same church as his earlier wedding. She was made a Dame Commander of the Order of the British Empire (DBE) in the 1937 Coronation Honours. Strickland was appointed a Companion of the Order of St Michael and St George (CMG) in 1889, for rendering invaluable services during a severe cholera epidemic. He was promoted to Knight Commander of the Order of St Michael and St George in 1897. He was raised to the Peerage of the United Kingdom as Baron Strickland, of Sizergh Castle in the County of Westmorland, on 19 January 1928. He died at Villa Bologna, his residence in Attard, and is buried in the family crypt at St. Paul's Cathedral, Mdina.

Honours

References

Bibliography
 Montalto, J., The Nobles of Malta-1530–1800, Midsea Books Ltd, Malta, 1980.
 Burkes Peerage, Baronetage and Knightage of the UK (106th ed.) (London 2002).
 Giles Ash, S., "The Nobility of Malta", Publishers Enterprises Group (PEG Ltd 1988).
 Koster, A., Prelates and politicians in Malta, (Amsterdam University 1977).

External links

 

|-

1861 births
1940 deaths
Alumni of St Mary's College, Oscott
Strickland, Gerald Strickland, 1st Baron
British Militia officers
British people of Maltese descent
Conservative Party (UK) MPs for English constituencies
Governors of the Leeward Islands
Governors of Tasmania
Governors of Western Australia
Governors of New South Wales
British politicians of Italian descent
Knights Grand Cross of the Order of St Michael and St George
Leaders of the Opposition (Malta)
Leaders of political parties in Malta
Members of the Inner Temple
People from Valletta
People from Attard
Presidents of the Cambridge Union
Prime Ministers of Malta
UK MPs 1924–1929
UK MPs who were granted peerages
Maltese knights
Maltese military personnel
19th-century Maltese politicians
20th-century Maltese politicians
Barons created by George V